Into the Night is a 1928 American silent crime film directed by Duke Worne and starring Agnes Ayres, Forrest Stanley and Corliss Palmer.

Cast
 Agnes Ayres as Billie Mardon 
 Forrest Stanley as Gavin Murdock 
 Robert Russell as Walter Van Buren 
 Thomas G. Lingham as Howard K. Howard 
 Rhody Hathaway as Jim Marden 
 Allan Sears as John Harding 
 Corliss Palmer as Mrs. Harding 
 Arthur Thalasso as Pat Shannon

References

Bibliography
 Munden, Kenneth White. The American Film Institute Catalog of Motion Pictures Produced in the United States, Part 1. University of California Press, 1997.

External links

1928 films
1928 crime films
American crime films
American silent feature films
1920s English-language films
American black-and-white films
Films directed by Duke Worne
1920s American films